Anthony McGregor (born 5 July 1972) is a former Australian rules footballer who played with Fitzroy in the Australian Football League (AFL).

A utility from Prahran, McGregor was selected by Fitzroy with pick 28 in the 1993 Mid-Season Draft. McGregor played 41 senior games, from 1993 to 1996. He received five Brownlow Medal votes in 1994, which was the equal third most by a Fitzroy player at the count.

References

External links

1972 births
Australian rules footballers from Victoria (Australia)
Fitzroy Football Club players
Living people